Ngula Bulgarabang Regional Park (colloquially Radiata Plateau) is a parcel of land on the upper Blue Mountains western escarpment, NSW, Australia.
The area comprises a well-defined plateau to the west of Pulpit Hill Road, Katoomba, with an area of 756 Acres of pristine natural bushland bordering the Megalong Valley and Greater Blue Mountains world heritage area.
The property was owned by the previous owners for 45 years (1974–2019) and known to them as ‘Invincibility Point’.

Formerly known as Pulpit Plateau, in the 1960s the plateau was cleared for a plantation of Radiata Pine, hence the colloquial name. The area was officially named Ngula Bulgarabang in June, 2020.

It was purchased by the NSW State Government in 2019 for $2.8 million.
On 8 October 2019, NSW Environment Minister Matt Kean announced that Radiata Plateau will be incorporated into the State's national park reserve system. The park was gazetted in June, 2020.

The area houses several species including the spotted-tail quoll, greater glider, and flame robin, while traditional Aboriginal pathway Blacks Ladder runs through the area.

References

Mountains of Australia
Plateaus of Australia
Protected areas of New South Wales